Coucy-la-Ville is a commune in the Aisne department in Hauts-de-France in northern France.

On the main Chauny to Soissons road, shortly after the village of Folembray, take a right hand turn and within half a mile you will come to the village of Coucy-la-Ville.

A single road runs through this small village passing a farm, a cafe-bar and a church. Then, as suddenly as you entered, you have left this small place. Up on the hill to your right you will see the remarkable view of the remains of the Château de Coucy, located in Coucy-le-Château-Auffrique. Down in Coucy-la-Ville, the area is flat and agricultural with its few houses dotted on either side of the road.

Administration

Population

See also
 Communes of the Aisne department

References

Communes of Aisne
Aisne communes articles needing translation from French Wikipedia